1004 may refer to:

 1004 (number), a number in the 1000s range
 AD 1004 (MIV), a year of the Common Era
 1004 BC, a year Before the Common Era

Places
 1004 Belopolskya, an asteroid in the asteroid belt, the 1004th asteroid registered
 Route 1004, see List of highways numbered 1004
 1004 Estate, Victoria Island, Lagos, Nigeria

Vehicles
 Glas 1004, a German automobile
 , a Type VIIC/41 German WWII U-boat
 , a WWI U.S. Navy patrol boat

Other uses
 United Nations Security Council Resolution 1004 (1995) concerning Srebrenica during the Yugoslavian wars of dissolution
 UNIVAC 1004, a digital computer
 ISO 1004, a standard for magnetic ink

See also

 MIV (disambiguation)
 104 (disambiguation)